Kaimana Nacua (born March 3, 1995) is an American football free safety who is a free agent. He played college football at BYU

Professional career

Cleveland Browns
Nacua was signed by the Cleveland Browns as an undrafted free agent on May 4, 2017. 

Throughout training camp, he competed for a roster spot against Justin Currie and Trey Caldwell. On September 3, 2017, the Browns waived Nacau and signed him to their practice squad the next day. On September 8, 2017, Nacua was promoted to the active roster. Head coach Hue Jackson named Nacua the backup strong safety behind Derrick Kindred to start the regular season.

He made his professional regular season debut in the Cleveland Browns' season-opening 21-18 loss to the Pittsburgh Steelers. On December 3, 2017, Nacua made his first career tackle during a 19-10 loss at the Los Angeles Chargers. In Week 14, Nacua earned his first career start after Derrick Kindred suffered a wrist injury the week prior. Nacua recorded a season-high five solo tackles during the Browns' 27-21 loss to the Green Bay Packers. He finished the season with 14 combined tackles (12 solo) in 16 games and three starts.

Nacua was waived by the Browns on April 30, 2018.

Baltimore Ravens
On May 1, 2018, Nacua was claimed off waivers by the Baltimore Ravens. He was waived on August 31, 2018. He was re-signed to the practice squad on September 15, 2018. He was released on October 15, 2018.

Carolina Panthers
On December 5, 2018, Nacua was signed to the Carolina Panthers practice squad. He signed a reserve/future contract with the Panthers on December 31, 2018. He was waived on August 4, 2019.

Indianapolis Colts
On August 19, 2019, Nacua signed with the Indianapolis Colts. He was waived/injured on August 31, 2019 and was placed on injured reserve.

San Francisco 49ers
On November 24, 2020, Nacua was signed to the San Francisco 49ers practice squad. He was promoted to the active roster on December 2, 2020. On February 11, 2021, Nacua signed a one-year contract extension with the 49ers. He was released on August 27, 2021. He re-signed to the practice squad on September 10, 2021.

New York Jets
On December 23, 2021, Nacua was signed by the New York Jets off the 49ers practice squad. He was promoted to the active roster on December 25, 2021.

On August 23, 2022, Nacua was released. On November 29, 2022, he was re-signed to the Jets practice squad. He was released on December 29.

NFL career statistics

Personal life
Nacua has two younger brothers, Puka and Samson. Puka Nacua plays wide receiver at BYU, while Samson Nacua is a member of the Pittsburgh Maulers in the USFL. Samson also played at BYU after transferring from Utah and Puka (sophomore) transferred from Washington.

References

External links
BYU Cougars bio
Cleveland Browns bio
Baltimore Ravens bio
San Francisco 49erss bio

Living people
1995 births
People from Henderson, Nevada
American sportspeople of Samoan descent
Players of American football from Nevada
Sportspeople from Las Vegas
American football defensive backs
BYU Cougars football players
Cleveland Browns players
Baltimore Ravens players
Carolina Panthers players
Indianapolis Colts players
San Francisco 49ers players
New York Jets players